The yoal, often referred to as the ness yoal, is a clinker-built craft used traditionally in Shetland, Scotland. It is designed primarily for rowing, but also handles well under its traditional square sail when running before the wind or on a broad reach.

The word is cognate with yawl and yole.

Construction

Until about 1860, yoals were imported in kit form from the area around Bergen in Norway. The traditional small wooden boats were known as either Strandebarmer or Oselvar from Os in Hordaland, Norway. The wooden boats were taken apart and then 'flat packed' for shipping to the Shetland Islands. Instead of sending complicated assembly instructions, they sent Norwegian boatbuilders to re-build them.  However, increasing customs duty meant that Shetland  builders took over the building but stayed mostly with the original Norwegian design.

All the parts of a yoal have a name, perhaps to make assembly easier when they came in kit form, or to make it easier to order spare parts. In many cases, the names of the parts bear a closer relationship to Norwegian than British usage. The descriptive text on this page names most of these parts.

There are six boards to the construction of a yoal, they are from the keel up, the gabbard straik; the Hassen Straik; the lower sool; the upper sool; the sand straik, and the upper wup.

The boards were fixed to three main frames baands which curved across the keel between gunwales, underneath the tafts (seats), and also to the stammerin or cant frame, near both bow and stern, before fixing to the fore and aft stems. The upper wups were joined by the hinny spot where they met the horn, at the top of the stem, for added strength.

The baands were not fixed to the keel, this again adding to the flexibility of the yoal.

The baands divided the boat into four sections: the fore room, for fishing tackle etc.; the mid room, for ballast; the owsin room, which was kept clear for bailing, owsin, any water which came aboard, using an owsekerri; and the shot room, which is where the catch was stored.

To save the gunwales from wear, at each aer, (oar), position a block of hard wood, the routh, was fixed in position with two wooden pegs called routh pins. Sticking up from the routh was the kabe, a hardwood  peg, against which the oar was rowed. The oar was held in position against the kabe by a loop of rope called the humlieband.

One notable feature of yoal construction are the gunwales which stop short at both bow and stern leaving several inches of upper board with no gunwale. This is supposed to give the craft more flexibility in heavy seas.

The yoal was rowed by three men with a pair of oars each. The men were seated on tafts, which rested on the wearin a wooden support which ran across the three main baands, and for purchase they could brace their feet against a fitlinn, a piece of wood across between the baands. The floorboards of the boat were called tilfers.

When wind conditions were baand yoal carried a square sail, hoisted on a wooden mast which was stepped through the mid taft and braced at its base to the mid 'baand'

History
The yoal was the main vessel used for haaf (open water within sight of land, up to 10 miles from shore) fishing for cod, ling and tusk until the fish shoals moved further offshore at the end of the 17th century, probably due to climatic change.  Although yoals were not designed for the far haaf, Shetland fishermen continued to use them for relatively deep sea fishing with attendant accidents and loss of life until the introduction in the mid 18th century of the larger, heavier and deeper sixareen designed for fishing further offshore. Although there were some variations in size the yoal was generally 21 ft 5in overall, 15 ft keel, 21in inside depth amidships and 5 ft 5in beam.

George Johnson of Skelberry, Dunrossness, was one of the most prolific builders of ness yoals. Among the yoals built by Johnson, in his later years, were several larger ones up to 23 ft 10in overall. One of these, which has now gone, was the Oceans Gift, so named because all the wood for her construction came from driftwood. Unusual features of these larger yoals were that their gunwales did not stop short of the stem and stern like the normal yoals, and some of them had a full fourth 'baand'.

Present day
Throughout Shetland many traditional yoals, built by Johnson, and others of his era, still exist. Very few are still in regular use, although in the Virkie Marina there are 2 which are used for pleasure fishing.

In recent years the advent of yoal rowing regattas has seen an upsurge in the building of these traditional craft.

Ian Best of Fair Isle, and Tommy Isbister of Trondra, are the most prolific yoal builders today.

See also
Faering
Oselvar

References

External links
Ian Best - Boatbuilder
Link to Osla, a yoal built by Tommy Isbister, under sail in Finland
Oselver
Film footage from Oselvar-regatta.
Video from sailing the Oselvar at Austevoll, west coast of Norway.
Video from sailing Oselvar regatta with "150 Ægir" at the Tysnes island, June 2016, Norway.

Fishing history of Shetland
Types of fishing vessels
Scottish design
Fishing in Scotland
Rowing boats